Below is the complete list of the Dutch records in swimming, which are ratified by the Royal Dutch Swimming Federation (KNZB).

Long course (50 m)

Men

Women

Mixed relay

Short course (25 m)

Men

Women

Mixed relay

References

External links
 KNZB web site
 KNZB Dutch Records page
 Dutch Records swimrankings.net 18 December 2022 updated

Dutch
Records
Swimming
Swimming